Genetic studies on Jews are part of the population genetics discipline and are used to analyze the chronology of Jewish migration accompanied by research in other fields, such as history, linguistics, archaeology, and paleontology. These studies investigate the origins of various Jewish ethnic divisions. In particular, they examine whether there is a common genetic heritage among them. The medical genetics of Jews are studied for population-specific diseases.

Studies of autosomal DNA, which look at the  entire DNA mixture, show that Jewish populations have tended to form relatively closely related groups in independent communities with most in a community sharing significant ancestry. For populations of the Jewish diaspora, the genetic composition of Ashkenazi, Sephardi, and Mizrahi Jewish populations show significant amounts of shared Middle Eastern ancestry. According to geneticist Doron Behar and colleagues (2010), this is "consistent with a historical formulation of the Jewish people as descending from ancient Hebrew and Israelites of the Levant" and "the dispersion of the people of ancient Israel throughout the Old World". Jewish groups also show genetic proximity to Lebanese, Palestinians, Bedouins, and Druze in addition to Southern European populations, including Cypriots and Italians.

Jews living in the North African, Italian, and Iberian regions show variable frequencies of admixture with the historical non-Jewish population along the maternal lines. In the case of Ashkenazi and Sephardi Jews (in particular Moroccan Jews), who are closely related, the source of non-Jewish admixture is mainly southern European. Behar and colleagues have remarked on an especially close relationship between Ashkenazi Jews and modern Italians. Some studies show that the Bene Israel and Cochin Jews of India, and the Beta Israel of Ethiopia, while very closely resembling the local populations of their native countries, may have some ancient Jewish descent.

History
As opposed to the religion of Judaism and its formative role in shaping Jewish identity, and the slow formation of a sense of Jewish nationality from Ezra and Nehemiah down to the Hasmoneans and onwards theories on the ethnic origins of Jews, and what constitutes ‘Jewishness’have been questioned. And according to Steven Weitzman, the traditional narrative of a descent from the  Israelites, together with attempts to furnish  genetic evidence corroborating the biblical storytelling, is disputed.

Despite extensive efforts in recent decades to identify genotypic common denominators that might be associated with Biblical Israelites, it has become "overwhelmingly clear", as noted by Raphael Falk, that while detectable genetic continuity exists in Jewish populations across generations, "there is no Jewish genotype to identify" and "genetic markers cannot determine Jewish descent".

As earlier as the 1950s, failed attempts were made to use markers such as finger-print patterns to characterize Jewish communities. In the 1960s, more success was made in tracking the distribution of genetic diseases in Jewish communities. Alongside this, studies were being conducted that focused on identifying trends in converging blood group frequencies. Also at this time, studies began being conducted based on blood groups and serum markers, research that yielded both evidence of Middle East origins among Jewish diaspora groups and a degree of commonality between Jewish populations relative to paired Jewish and non-Jewish populations. While efforts to find converging blood group frequencies that might point to "hypothetical ancient Jews" were not successful, according to Falk, this "did not discourage the authors" from making claims of common ancestry.

From the mid-1970s onwards, RNA and DNA sequencing enabled the comparison of genetic relationships, and during the 1980s, it also became possible to examine genetic polymorphism across multiple sites in DNA sequences. During this period, researchers worked to categorize the relatedness between different Jewish groups. Due to a paucity of polymorphic markers, the early studies "focused on genetic distances" and building hierarchal models between population samples. Advances in DNA sequence analysis using algorithms based on "probable common forefathers on the assumption of branching phylogenies" pointed to common progenitors among diverse Jewish communities, as well as overlap with Mediterranean populations. Both the early studies on blood markers and later studies of the monoallelic Y chromosomal and mitochondrial DNA (mtDNA) haplotypes revealed evidence of both Middle Eastern and local origin, with indeterminate levels of local genetic admixture. The conclusions of the diverse studies conducted turned out to be "remarkably similar", providing both evidence of shared genetic ancestry among major diaspora groups and varied levels of local genetic admixture.

In the 1990s, this developed into attempts to identify markers in highly discrete population groups. The results were mixed. One study on the Cohanim hereditary priesthood found distinctive signs of genetic homogeneity within the group. At the same time, no unusual clustering of Y-haplotypes was found relative to non-Cohanim Jews. However, such studies did show that certain population groups could be identified. As David Goldstein noted: "Our studies of the Cohanim established that present day Ashkenazi and Sephardi Cohanim are more genetically similar to one another than they are to either Israelites or non-Jews."

In the late 1990s, Uzi Ritte cross-analyzed Y-chromosome and mtDNA sequences in six Jewish communities and found indications of "admixture with neighboring communities of non-Jews". A study of Ashkenazi mtDNA in 2013 meanwhile revealed four matrilineal founders, all of which had ancestry in prehistoric Europe, rather than the Near East or Caucasus. Falk notes that, "not surprisingly, Ashkenazi Jews prove to compose a distinct yet quite integral branch of European genomic tapestry."

Hypotheses

A 2009 study was able to genetically identify individuals with full or partial Ashkenazi Jewish ancestry. In August 2012, Legacy: A Genetic History of the Jewish People,  a book by Harry Osterer, concluded that all major Jewish groups share a common Middle Eastern origin. Ostrer also refuted the Khazar hypothesis of Ashkenazi ancestry. Autosomal genetic analysis in 2012 revealed that North African Jews are genetically close to European Jews, which "shows that North African Jews date to biblical-era Israel, and are not largely the descendants of natives who converted to Judaism,"

Y DNA studies examine various paternal lineages of modern Jewish populations. Such studies tend to imply a small number of founders in an old population whose members parted and followed different migration paths. In most Jewish populations, these male line ancestors appear to have been mainly Middle Eastern. For example, Ashkenazi Jews share more common paternal lineages with other Jewish and Middle Eastern groups than with non-Jewish populations in areas where Jews lived in Eastern Europe, Germany and the Rhine Valley. This is consistent with Jewish traditions in placing most Jewish paternal origins in the region of the Middle East.

A study conducted in 2013 by Behar et al. found no evidence of a Khazar origin for Ashkenazi Jews and stated that this lack of evidence "corroborates earlier results that Ashkenazi Jews derive their ancestry primarily from populations of the Middle East and Europe, that they possess considerable shared ancestry with other Jewish populations, and that there is no indication of a significant genetic contribution either from within or from north of the Caucasus region."

In 2016, Eran Elhaik, together with Ranajit Das, Paul Wexler and Mehdi Pirooznia, advanced the view that the first Ashkenazi populations to speak the Yiddish language came from areas near four villages in Eastern Anatolia along the Silk Road whose names derived from the word "Ashkenaz", arguing that Iranian, Greek, Turkish, and Slav populations converted on that travel route before moving to Khazaria, where a small-scale conversion took place. The study was dismissed by Sergio DellaPergola as a "falsification", noting it failed to include Jewish groups such as the Italkim and Sephardic Jews, to whom Ashkenazi Jews are closely related genetically. Shaul Stampfer called Elhaik's research "basically nonsense". Elhaik replied that the DNA of non-Ashkenazic Jews would not affect the origin of DNA hypothesized for the former. Dovid Katz criticized the study's linguistic analysis, stating: "The authors have melded accurate but contextually meaningless genetic correlations with laughable linguistic theories ... there is not a single word or sound in Yiddish that comes from Iranian or Turkish". In joint study published in 2016 by Genome Biology and Evolution,  Pavel Flegontov from Department of Biology and Ecology, Faculty of Science, University of Ostrava, Czech Republic, A. A. Kharkevich Institute of Linguistics, Russian Academy of Sciences, Moscow, Mark G. Thomas from Research Department of Genetics, Evolution and Environment, University College London, UK, Valentina Fedchenko from Saint Petersburg State University, and George Starostin from Russian State University for the Humanities, dismissed both the genetic and linguistic components of Elhaik et al. study arguing that "GPS is a provenancing tool suited to inferring the geographic region where a modern and recently unadmixed genome is most likely to arise, but is hardly suitable for admixed populations and for tracing ancestry up to 1000 years before present, as its authors have previously claimed. Moreover, all methods of historical linguistics concur that Yiddish is a Germanic language, with no reliable evidence for Slavic, Iranian, or Turkic substrata." The authors concluded:"In our view, Das and co-authors have attempted to fit together a marginal and unsupported interpretation of the linguistic data with a genetic provenancing approach, GPS, that is at best only suited to inferring the most likely geographic location of modern and relatively unadmixed genomes, and tells nothing of population history and origin."The authors, in a non peer-reviewed response, defended the methodological adequacy of their approach. In 2016 Elhaik having reviewed the literature searching for a 'Jüdische Typus' argued that there is no genomic hallmark for Jewishness. While he allows that in the future it is possible that a 'Jewish' marker may turn up, so far, in his view, Jewishness turns out to be socially defined (a socionome), determined by non-genetic factors. On 31 October 2016 a corrigendum to the initial GPS paper by Elhaik et al. 2014 was published in Nature Communications. The GPS tool, remained freely available on the lab website of Dr. Tatiana Tatarinova, but as of December 2016 the link is broken. In 2017, the same authors further supported a non-Levantine origin of Ashkenazi Jews claiming that "Overall, the combined results (of linguistics study and GPS tool)  are in a strong agreement with the predictions of the Irano-Turko-Slavic hypothesis and rule out an ancient Levantine origin for AJs, which is predominant among modern-day Levantine populations (e.g., Bedouins and Palestinians)." Elhaik's and Das' work was among others, strongly criticized by Marion Aptroot from University of Düsseldorf, who in the study published by Genome Biology and Evolution claimed that "Das et al. create a narrative based on genetic, philological and historical research and state that the findings of the three disciplines support each other...Incomplete and unreliable data from times when people were not counted regardless of sex, age, religion or financial or social status on the one hand, and the dearth of linguistic evidence predating the 15th century on the other, leave much room for conjecture and speculation. Linguistic evidence, however, does not support the theory that Yiddish is a Slavic language, and textual sources belie the thesis that the name Ashkenaz was brought to Eastern Europe directly from a region in the Near East. Although the focus and methods of research may be different in the humanities and the sciences, scholars should try to account for all evidence and observations, regardless of the field of research. Seen from the standpoint of the humanities, certain aspects of the article by Das et al. fall short of established standards".

A 2020 study on remains from Bronze Age southern Levantine (Canaanite) populations found evidence of large scale migration from the Zagros or Caucasus into the southern Levant by the Bronze Age and increasing over time (resulting in a Canaanite population descended from both those migrants and earlier Neolithic Levantine peoples). The results were found to be consistent with several Jewish groups and non-Jewish Arabic-speaking Levantine populations (such as Lebanese, Druze, Palestinians, and Syrians) deriving about half or more of their ancestry from populations related to those from the Bronze Age Levant and Chalcolithic Zagros. The study modeled the aforementioned groups as having ancestry from both ancient populations.

In August 2022, Elhaik published a critique of the methodology of PCA that lies at the core of studies by population geneticists seeking to identify ethnogenesis, instancing work on the Ashkenazi Jews, among several others. His re-analysis concludes that the outcomes are generated by cherrypicking the data to obtain a foregone conclusion of origins - a Middle Eastern link in the case of the Ashkenazi - and argues that the circular reasoning in the procedure lends itself to eliciting "erroneous, contradictory, and absurd results."

In a study published in December 2022, new genome data obtained from the medieval Jewish cemetery of Erfurt, Germany was used to further trace the origins of the Ashkenazi Jewish community. These findings suggest that medieval Erfurt had at least two related but genetically distinct Jewish groups: one was closely related to Middle Eastern populations and was especially similar to modern Ashkenazi Jews from France and Germany and modern Sephardic Jews from Turkey; the other group had a substantial contribution from Eastern European populations. Modern Ashkenazi Jews from Eastern Europe no longer exhibit this genetic variability, and instead, their genomes resemble a nearly even mixture of the two Erfurt groups (with about 60% from the first group and 40% from the second).

Paternal line 

Approximately 35% to 43% of Jewish men are in the paternal line known as haplogroup J and its sub-haplogroups. This haplogroup is particularly present in the Middle East and Southern Europe. 15% to 30% are in haplogroup E1b1b, (or E-M35) and its sub-haplogroups which is common in the Middle East, North Africa, and Southern Europe.

In 1992 G. Lucotte and F. David were the first genetic researchers to have documented a common paternal genetic heritage between Sephardi and Ashkenazi Jews. Another study published just a year later suggested the Middle Eastern origin of Jewish paternal lineages.

In 2000, M. Hammer, et al. conducted a study on 1,371 men and definitively established that part of the paternal gene pool of Jewish communities in Europe, North Africa and Middle East came from a common Middle East ancestral population. They suggested that most Jewish communities in the Diaspora remained relatively isolated and endogamous compared to non-Jewish neighbor populations.

Investigations made by Nebel et al. on the genetic relationships among Ashkenazi Jews, Kurdish and Sephardi (North Africa, Turkey, Iberian Peninsula, Iraq and Syria) indicate that Jews are more genetically similar to groups in the northern Fertile Crescent (Kurds, Turks and Armenians) than their Arab neighbors, and suggest that some of this difference might be due to migration and admixture from the Arabian peninsula during the last two millennia (into certain current Arabic-speaking populations). Considering the timing of this origin, the study found that "the common genetic Middle Eastern background (of Jewish populations) predates the ethnogenesis in the region and concludes that the Y chromosome pool of Jews is an integral part of the genetic landscape of Middle East.

Lucotte et al. 2003 study found that  (Oriental, Sephardic, Ashkenazic Jews and Lebanese and Palestinians), "seem to be similar in their Y-haplotype patterns, both with regard to the haplotype distributions and the ancestral haplotype VIII frequencies." The authors stated in their findings that these results confirm similarities in the Y-haplotype frequencies of this Near-Eastern populations, sharing a common geographic origin."

In a study of Israeli Jews from four different groups (Ashkenazi Jews, Kurdish Jews, North African Sephardi Jews, and Iraqi Jews) and Palestinian Muslim Arabs, more than 70% of the Jewish men and 82% of the Arab men whose DNA was studied had inherited their Y chromosomes from the same paternal ancestors, who lived in the region within the last few thousand years. "Our recent study of high-resolution microsatellite haplotypes demonstrated that a substantial portion of Y chromosomes of Jews (70%) and of Palestinian Muslim Arabs (82%) belonged to the same chromosome pool." All Jewish groups were found to be genetically closer to each other than to Palestinians and Muslim Kurds. Kurdish, North African Sephardi, and Iraqi Jews were found to be genetically indistinguishable while slightly but significantly differing from Ashkenazi Jews. In relation to the region of the Fertile Crescent, the same study noted; "In comparison with data available from other relevant populations in the region, Jews were found to be more closely related to groups in the north of the Fertile Crescent (Kurds, Turks, and Armenians) than to their Arab neighbors", which the authors suggested was due to migration and admixture from the Arabian Peninsula into certain current Arabic-speaking populations during the period of Islamic expansion.

Y-DNA of Ashkenazi Jews
The Y chromosome of most Ashkenazi and Sephardi Jews contains mutations that are common among Middle Eastern peoples, but uncommon in the general European population, according to a study of haplotypes of the Y chromosome by Michael Hammer, Harry Ostrer and others, published in 2000.  According to Hammer et al. this suggests that the paternal lineages of Ashkenazi Jews could be traced mostly to the Middle East.

In Ashkenazi (and Sephardi) Jews, the most common paternal lineages generally are E1b1b, J2, and J1, with others found at lesser rates.

Hammer et al. add that "Diaspora Jews from Europe, Northwest Africa, and the Near East resemble each other more closely than they resemble their non-Jewish neighbors." In addition, the authors have found that the  "Jewish cluster was interspersed with the Palestinian and Syrian populations, whereas the other Middle Eastern non-Jewish populations (Saudi Arabians, Lebanese, and Druze) closely surrounded it. Of the Jewish populations in this cluster, the Ashkenazim were closest to South European populations (specifically the Greeks) and they were also closest to the Turks." The study estimated that on their paternal side, Ashkenazi Jews are descended from a core population of approximately 20,000 Jews who migrated from Italy into the rest of Europe over the course of the first millennium, and it also estimated that "All European Jews seem connected on the order of fourth or fifth cousins." The study also maintained that the paternal lines of Roman Jews were close to those of Ashkenazi Jews. It asserts that these mostly originated from the Middle East.

The estimated cumulative total male genetic admixture amongst Ashkenazim was, according to Hammer et al., "very similar to Motulsky's average estimate of 12.5%. This could be the result, for example, of "as little as 0.5% per generation, over an estimated 80 generations", according to Hammer et al. Such figures indicated that there had been a "relatively minor contribution" to Ashkenazi  paternal lineages by converts to Judaism and non-Jews. These figures, however, were based on a limited range of paternal haplogroups assumed to have originated in  Europe. When potentially European haplogroups were included in the analysis, the estimated admixture increased to 23 per cent (±7%).
 
The frequency of haplogroup R1b in the Ashkenazim population is similar to the frequency of R1b in Middle Eastern populations. This is significant, because R1b is also the most common haplogroup amongst non-Jewish males in Western Europe. That is, the commonness of nominally Middle Eastern subclades of R1b amongst Ashkenazim tends to minimize the Western European contribution to the ~10% of R1b found amongst Ashkenazim. A large study by Behar et al. (2004) of Ashkenazi Jews records a percentage of 5–8% European contribution to the Ashkenazi paternal gene pool. In the words of Behar: 
For G. Lucotte et al., the R1b frequency is about 11%. In 2004, When the calculation is made excluding Jews from Netherlands the R1b rate is 5% ± 11.6%.

Two studies by Nebel et al. in 2001 and 2005, based on Y chromosome polymorphic markers, suggested that Ashkenazi Jews are more closely related to other Jewish and Middle Eastern groups than they are to their host populations in Europe (defined in the using Eastern European, German, and French Rhine Valley populations). Ashkenazi, Sephardic, and Kurdish Jews were all very closely related to the populations of the Fertile Crescent, even closer than to Arabs. The study speculated that the ancestors of the Arab populations of the Levant might have diverged due to mixing with migrants from the Arabian Peninsula. However, 11.5% of male Ashkenazim, and more specifically 50% of the Levites while 1.7% of the Cohanim, were found to belong to R1a1a (R-M17), the dominant Y chromosome haplogroup in Eastern European populations. They hypothesized that these chromosomes could reflect low-level gene flow from surrounding Eastern European populations, or, alternatively, that both the Ashkenazi Jews with R1a1a (R-M17), and to a much greater extent Eastern European populations in general, might partly be descendants of Khazars. They concluded "However, if the R1a1a (R-M17) chromosomes in Ashkenazi Jews do indeed represent the vestiges of the mysterious Khazars then, according to our data, this contribution was limited to either a single founder or a few closely related men, and does not exceed ~12% of the present-day Ashkenazim." This hypothesis is also supported by David B. Goldstein in his book Jacob's legacy: A genetic view of Jewish history. However, Faerman (2008) states that "External low-level gene flow of possible Eastern European origin has been shown in Ashkenazim but no evidence of a hypothetical Khazars' contribution to the Ashkenazi gene pool has ever been found." A 2017 study, concentrating on the Ashkenazi Levites where the proportion reaches 50%, while signaling that there's a "rich variation of haplogroup R1a outside of Europe which is phylogenetically separate from the typically European R1a branches", precises that the particular R1a-Y2619 sub-clade testifies for a local origin, and that the "Middle Eastern origin of the Ashkenazi Levite lineage based on what was previously a relatively limited number of reported samples, can now be considered firmly validated."

Furthermore, 7% of Ashkenazi Jews have the haplogroup G2c, which is mainly found among the Pashtuns and on a lower scale, it is mainly found among members of all major Jewish ethnic groups, Palestinians, Syrians, and Lebanese. Behar et al. suggest that those haplogroups are minor Ashkenazi founding lineages.

Among Ashkenazi Jews, the Jews of the Netherlands seem to have a particular distribution of haplogroups since nearly one quarter of them have the Haplogroup R1b1 (R-P25), in particular sub-haplogroup R1b1b2 (R-M269), which is characteristic of Western European populations.

Ashkenazi men show a low level of Y-DNA diversity within each major haplogroup, which means that compared to the size of the modern population, it seems that there once was a relatively small number of men having children. This possibly results from a series of founder events and high rates of endogamy within Europe. Despite Ashkenazi Jews representing a recently founded population in Europe, founding effects suggest that they probably derived from a large and diverse ancestral source population in the Middle East, who may have been larger than the source population from which the non-Jewish Europeans derived.

Y-DNA of Sephardi Jews
The first largest study on the Jews of North Africa has been led by Gerard Lucotte et al. in 2003. This study showed that the Jews of North Africa showed frequencies of their paternal haplotypes almost equal to those of the Lebanese and Palestinian non-Jews. The authors also compared the distribution of haplotypes of Jews from North Africa with Sephardi Jews, Ashkenazi Jews, and "Oriental" (Mizrahi) Jews, and found significant differences between the Ashkenazim and Mizrahim and the other two groups.

The Jewish community of the island of Djerba in Tunisia is of special interest, Tradition traces this community's origins back to the time of the destruction of Solomon's Temple. Two studies have attempted to test this hypothesis first by G. Lucotte et al. from 1993, the second of F. Manni et al. of 2005. They also conclude that the Jews of Djerba's paternal gene pool is different from the Arabs and Berbers of the island. For the first 77.5% of samples tested are of haplotype VIII (probably similar to the J haplogroup according Lucotte), the second shows that 100% of the samples are of Haplogroup J *. The second suggests that it is unlikely that the majority of this community comes from an ancient colonization of the island while for Lucotte it is unclear whether this high frequency is really an ancient relationship. These studies therefore suggest that the paternal lineage of North African Jews comes predominantly from the Middle East with a minority contribution of African lineages, probably Berbers.

The largest study to date on Jews who lived in North Africa was conducted in 2012 and was led by Prof. Harry Ostrer of the departments of pathology, genetics and pediatrics at the Albert Einstein College of Medicine at New York's Yeshiva University, and was published online in the Proceedings of the National Academy of Sciences of the United States of America, in it the scholars had found that the Jews who lived in Morocco and Algeria had more European admixture in their gene pools than the Jews who lived in Tunisia and Libya, probably as a result of a larger expelled Sephardi Jewish population settling in those two first mentioned lands post 1492 and 1497. All communities of North African Jews exhibited a high degree of endogamy.

A study by Inês Nogueiro et al. (July 2009) on the Jews of north-eastern Portugal (region of Trás-os-Montes) showed that their paternal lines consisted of 35.2% lineages more typical of Europe (R : 31.7%, I : 3.5%), and 64.8% lineages more typical of the Near East than Europe (E1b1b: 8.7%, G: 3.5%, J: 36.8%, T: 15.8%) and consequently, the Portuguese Jews of this region were genetically closer to other Jewish populations than to Portuguese non-Jews.

Y-DNA of Mizrahi Jews 
In the article by Nebel et al. the authors show that Kurdish and Sephardi Jews have indistinguishable paternal genetic heritage, with both being similar to but slightly differing from Ashkenazi Jews (possibly due to a low-level European admixture or a genetic drift during isolation among Ashkenazim). The study shows that mixtures between Kurdish Jews and their Muslim hosts are negligible and Kurdish Jews are closer to other Jewish groups than they are to their long term host population. Hammer had already shown the strong correlation between the genetic heritage of Jews from North Africa with Kurdish Jews. Sample size 9/50 – 18% haplogroup T1.

A 2002 study by geneticist Dror Rosengarten found that the paternal haplotypes of Mountain Jews "were shared with other Jewish communities and were consistent with a Mediterranean origin." A 2016 study by Karafet at all found, with a sample of 17, 11.8% of Mountain Jewish men tested in Dagestan's Derbentsky District to belong to Haplogroup T-P77.

The studies of Shen and Hammer et al. show that the paternal genes of Yemenite Jews are very similar to those of other Jewish populations. They include Y haplogroups A3b2, E3b3a, E3b1, E3b1b, J1a, J2e, R1b10, and the lowest frequency found was Haplogroup T-M184 2/94 2.1% in one sample.

Y-DNA of Ethiopian Jews 
A study of  Lucotte and Smets has shown that the genetic father of Beta Israel (Ethiopian Jews) was close to the Ethiopian non-Jewish populations. This is consistent with the theory that Beta Israel are descendants of ancient inhabitants of Ethiopia, not the Middle East.

Hammer et al. in 2000 and the team of Shen in 2004 arrive at similar conclusions, namely a genetic differentiation inother people in the north of Ethiopia, which probably indicates a conversion of local populations.

A 2010 study by Behar et al. on the Beta Israel showed similar Middle Eastern genetic clustering to Semitic-speaking Ethiopian non-Jewish Tigrayans and Amharas, but more than Cushitic-speaking non-Jewish Ethiopian Oromos.

Y-DNA of Indian Jews

Genetic analysis shows that the Bene Israel of India cluster with the indigenous populations of western India, but do have a clear paternal link to the populations of the Levant.
A recent more detailed study on Indian Jews has reported that the paternal ancestry of Indian Jews is composed of Middle East specific haplogroups (E, G, J(xJ2) and I) as well as common South Asian haplogroups (R1a, H, L-M11, R2).

Priestly families

Cohanim

Nephrologist Dr. Karl Skorecki decided to analyze the Cohanim to see if they were the descendants of one man, in which case they should have a set of common genetic markers.

To test this hypothesis, he contacted Dr. Michael Hammer of the University of Arizona, a researcher in molecular genetics and a pioneer in research on chromosomes. Their article, published in Nature in 1997, has had some impact. A set of special markers (called Cohen Modal Haplotype or CMH) was defined as one which is more likely to be present in the Cohanim, defined as contemporary Jews named Cohen or a derivative, and it was proposed that this results from a common descent from the ancient priestly lineage than from the Jewish population in general.

But, subsequent studies showed that the number of genetic markers used and the number of samples (of people saying Cohen) were not big enough.  The last study, conducted in 2009 by Hammer and Behar et al., says 20 of the 21 Cohen haplogroups have no single common young haplogroup; five haplogroups comprise 79.5% of all haplogroups of Cohen. Among these first 5 haplogroups, J-P58 (or J1E) accounts for 46.1% of Cohen and the second major haplogroup, J-M410 or J2a accounts for 14.4%. Hammer and Behar have redefined an extended CMH haplotype as determined by a set of 12 markers and having as "background" haplogroup determining the most important lines J1E (46.1%). This haplotype is absent among non-Jews in 2009 analyzed in the study. This divergence would appear to be from 3000 ± 1000 years ago. This study nevertheless confirms that the current Cohen lineage descended from a small number of paternal ancestors.

In the summary of their findings the authors concluded that " Our estimates of the coalescence time also lend support to the hypothesis that the extended CMH represents a unique founding lineage of the ancient Hebrews that has been paternally inherited along with the Jewish priesthood."

Molecular phylogenetics research published in 2013 and 2016 for Levant haplogroup J1 (J-M267) places the Y-chromosomal Aaron within subhaplogroup Z18271, age estimate 2638–3280 years Before Present (yBP).

The Lemba of South Africa, a Bantu speaking people whose culture forbids the consumption of pork and requires male circumcision, has a high frequency of the Middle Eastern Y-chromosome HgJ-12f2a (25%), a potentially SEA Y, Hg-K(xPQR) (32%) and a Bantu Y, E-PN1 (30%) (similar to E-M2). The Lemba tribe of Venda in South Africa claims to be Jewish and to have originated in Sena – possibly Yemenite Sena in Wadi Masila of the Hadramaut. There are indications of genetic connections with the Hadramaut, i.e., the Lemba Y-chromosomes and Hadramaut Y-chromosomes showed overlap. In addition, there was also present a Cohen Modal Haplotype (CMH) within their subclan, the Buba – higher than the general Jewish population. It has been suggested by Tudor Parfitt and Yulia Egorova that their Jewish ancestors probably came along with general Semitic incursions into East Africa from South Arabia, and then moved slowly south through the area of Great Zimbabwe.

Levites
A 2003 study of the Y-chromosome by Behar et al. pointed to multiple origins for Ashkenazi Levites, a priestly class who comprise approximately 4% of Ashkenazi Jews. It found that Haplogroup R1a1a (R-M17), which is uncommon in the Middle East or among Sephardi Jews, but dominant in Eastern Europe, is present in over 50% of Ashkenazi Levites, while the rest of Ashkenazi Levites' paternal lineage is of apparent Middle Eastern origin. Behar suggested a founding event, probably involving one or very few European men, occurring at a time close to the initial formation and settlement of the Ashkenazi community as a possible explanation. Nebel, Behar and Goldstein speculated that this may indicate a Khazar origin.

However, a 2013 study by Rootsi, Behar et al. found that R1a-M582, the specific subclade of R1a to which all sampled Ashkenazi Levites with R1a belonged, was completely absent of a sample of 922 Eastern Europeans and was only found in one of the 2,164 samples from the Caucasus, while it made up 33.8% of non-Levite Ashkenazi R1a and was also found in 5.9% of Near Easterners bearing R1a. The clade, though less represented in Near Easterners, was more diverse among them than among Ashkenazi Jews. Rootsi et al. argued this supports a Near Eastern Hebrew origin for the paternal lineage R1a present among Ashkenazi Levites: R1a-M582 was also found among different Iranian populations, among Kurds from Cilician Anatolia and Kazakhstan, and among non-Ashkenazi Jews.

Maternal line 

Studies of mitochondrial DNA of Jewish populations are more recent and are still debatable. The maternal lineages of Jewish populations, studied by looking at mitochondrial DNA, are generally more heterogeneous. Scholars such as Harry Ostrer and Raphael Falk believe this may indicate that many Jewish males found new mates from European and other communities in the places where they migrated in the diaspora after fleeing ancient Israel.

According to Thomas et al. in 2002, a number of Jewish communities reveal direct-line maternal ancestry originating from a few women. This was seen in independently founded communities in different geographic areas. What they shared was limited genetic additions later on the female side. Together, this is described as the founder effect. Those same communities had diversity in the male lines that was similar to the non-Jewish population. Two studies in 2006 and 2008 suggested that about 40% of Ashkenazi Jews originate maternally from just four female founders who were likely of Near-Eastern origin, while the populations of Sephardi and Mizrahi Jewish communities "showed no evidence for a narrow founder effect".

With the exception of Ethiopian Jews and Indian Jews, it has been argued that all of the various Jewish populations have components of mitochondrial genomes that were of Middle Eastern origin. In 2013, however, Richards et al. published work suggesting that an overwhelming majority of Ashkenazi Jewish maternal ancestry, estimated at "80 percent of Ashkenazi maternal ancestry comes from women indigenous to Europe, and [only] 8 percent from the Near East, with the rest uncertain", suggesting that Jewish males migrated to Europe and took new wives from the local population, and converted them to Judaism, though some geneticists, such as Doron Behar, have expressed disagreement with the study's conclusions. Another study by Eva Fernandez and her colleagues argues that the K lineages (claimed to be European in origin by Richards et al.) in Ashkenazi Jews might have an ancient Near Eastern source.

Reflecting on previous mtDNA studies carried out by Behar, Atzmon et al. conclude that all major Jewish population groups are showing evidence for founder females of Middle Eastern origin with coalescence times >2000 years. A 2013 study by Richards et al., based on a much larger sample base, drew differing conclusions, namely, that the Mt-DNA of Ashkenazi Jews originated among southern European women, where Diaspora communities had been established centuries before the fall of the Second Temple in 70 CE. A 2014 study by Fernandez et al. found that Ashkenazi Jews display a frequency of haplogroup K which suggests an ancient Near Eastern origin, stating that this observation clearly contradicts the results of the study led by Richards which suggested a predominantly European origin for the Ashkenazi community's maternal lines. However, the authors of the 2014 study also state that definitively answering the question of whether this group was of Jewish origin rather than the result of a Neolithic migration to Europe would require the genotyping of the complete mtDNA in ancient Near Eastern populations.

MtDNA of Ashkenazi Jews 
In 2004, Behar et al. found that approximately 32% of Ashkenazi Jews belong to the mitochondrial Haplogroup K, which points to a genetic bottleneck having taken place some 100 generations prior. Haplogroup K itself is thought to have originated in Western Asia some 12,000 years ago.

A 2006 study by Behar et al., based on high-resolution analysis of Haplogroup K (mtDNA), suggested that about 40% of the current Ashkenazi population is descended matrilineally from just four women, or "founder lineages", likely of mixed European and Middle Eastern origin. They concluded that these founder lineages may have originated in the Middle East in the 1st and 2nd centuries CE, and later underwent expansion in Europe. Moreover, a maternal line "sister" was found among the Jews of Portugal, North Africa, France, and Italy. They wrote:

Both the extent and location of the maternal ancestral deme from which the Ashkenazi Jewry arose remain obscure. Here, using complete sequences of the maternally inherited mitochondrial DNA (mtDNA), we show that close to one-half of Ashkenazi Jews, estimated at 8,000,000 people, can be traced back to only four women carrying distinct mtDNAs that are virtually absent in other populations, with the important exception of low frequencies among non-Ashkenazi Jews. We conclude that four founding mtDNAs, likely of Near Eastern ancestry, underwent major expansion(s) in Europe within the past millennium…

A 2007 study by J. Feder et al. confirmed the hypothesis of the founding of non-European origin among the maternal lines. Their study did not address the geographical origin of Ashkenazim and therefore does not explicitly confirm the origin "Levantine" of these founders. This study revealed a significant divergence in total haplogroup distribution between the Ashkenazi Jewish populations and their European host populations, namely Russians, Poles and Germans. They concluded that, regarding mtDNAs, the differences between Jews and non-Jews are far larger than those observed among the Jewish communities. The study also found that "the differences between the Jewish communities can be overlooked when non-Jews are included in the comparisons." It supported previous interpretations that, in the direct maternal line, there was "little or no gene flow from the local non-Jewish communities in Poland and Russia to the Jewish communities in these countries."

Considering Ashkenazi Jews, Atzmon (citing Behar above) states that beyond four founder mitochondrial haplogroups of possible Middle Eastern origins which comprise approximately 40% of Ashkenazi Jewish mtDNA, the remainder of the mtDNA falls into other haplogroups, many of European origin. He noted that beyond Ashkenazi Jews, "Evidence for founder females of Middle Eastern origin has been observed in other Jewish populations based on non-overlapping mitochondrial haplotypes with coalescence times >2000 years".

A 2013 study at the University of Huddersfield, led by Professor Martin B. Richards, concluded that 65%-81% of Ashkenazi Mt-DNA is European in origin, including all four founding mothers, and that most of the remaining lineages are also European. The results were published in Nature Communications in October 2013. The team analyzed about 2,500 complete and 28,000 partial Mt-DNA genomes of mostly non-Jews, and 836 partial Mt-DNA genomes of Ashkenazi Jews. The study claims that only 8% of Ashkenazi Mt-DNA could be identified as Middle Eastern in origin, with the origin of the rest being unclear.

They wrote:
If we allow for the possibility that K1a9 and N1b2 might have a Near Eastern source, then we can estimate the overall fraction of European maternal ancestry at ~65%. Given the strength of the case for even these founders having a European source, however, our best estimate is to assign ~81% of Ashkenazi lineages to a European source, ~8% to the Near East and ~1% further to the east in Asia, with ~10% remaining ambiguous... Thus at least two-thirds and most likely more than four-fifths of Ashkenazi maternal lineages have a European ancestry.

Regarding the origin of Ashkenazi admixture, the analyses suggest that "the first major wave of assimilation probably took place in Mediterranean Europe, most likely in Southern Europe, with substantial further assimilation of minor founders in west/central Europe." According to Richards, who acknowledged past research showing that Ashkenazi Jews' paternal origins are largely from the Middle East, the most likely explanation is that Ashkenazi Jews are descended from Middle Eastern men who moved to Europe and married local women whom they converted to Judaism. The authors found "less evidence for assimilation in Eastern Europe, and almost none for a source in the North Caucasus/Chuvashia, as would be predicted by the Khazar hypothesis."

The study was criticized by geneticist Doron Behar, who stated that while the Mt-DNA of Ashkenazi Jews is of mixed Middle Eastern and European origins, the deepest maternal roots of Ashkenazi Jews are not European. Harry Ostrer said Richards' study seemed reasonable, and corresponded to the known facts of Jewish history. Karl Skorecki of the Rambam Health Care Campus stated that there were serious flaws of phylogenetic analysis.

David B. Goldstein, the Duke University geneticist who first found similarities between the founding mothers of Ashkenazi Jewry and European populations, said that, although Richards' analysis was well-done and 'could be right,' the estimate that 80% of Ashkenazi Jewish Mt-DNA is European was not statistically justified given the random rise and fall of mitochondrial DNA lineages. Geneticist Antonio Torroni of the University of Pavia found the conclusions very convincing, adding that recent studies of cell nucleus DNA also show "a very close similarity between Ashkenazi Jews and Italians". Diaspora communities were established in Rome and in Southern Europe centuries before the fall of the Second Temple in 70 CE.

A 2014 study by Fernandez et al. found that Ashkenazi Jews display a frequency of haplogroup K which suggests ancient Middle Eastern origins, stating that this observation clearly contradicts the results of the study led by Richards which suggested a predominantly European origin for the Ashkenazi community's maternal line. However, the authors also state that definitively answering the question of whether this group was of Jewish origin rather than the result of a Neolithic migration to Europe would require the genotyping of the complete mtDNA in ancient Near Eastern populations. On the study by Richards:
According to that work the majority of the Ashkenazi mtDNA lineages can be assigned to three major founders within haplogroup K (31% of their total lineages): K1a1b1a, K1a9 and K2a2. The absence of characteristic mutations within the control region in the PPNB K-haplotypes allow discarding them as members of either sub-clades K1a1b1a or K2a2, both representing a 79% of total Ashkenazi K lineages. However, without a high-resolution typing of the mtDNA coding region it cannot be excluded that the PPNB K lineages belong to the third sub-cluster K1a9 (20% of Askhenazi K lineages). Moreover, in the light of the evidence presented here of a loss of lineages in the Near East since Neolithic times, the absence of Ashkenazi mtDNA founder clades in the Near East should not be taken as a definitive argument for its absence in the past. The genotyping of the complete mtDNA in ancient Near Eastern populations would be required to fully answer this question and it will undoubtedly add resolution to the patterns detected in modern populations in this and other studies.

A 2022 study by Kevin Brook focused on the Mt-DNA of Ashkenazi Jews and used thousands of complete sequences. Brook found a total of six branches of haplogroup K in Ashkenazim that each represent separate founding women: K1a1b1*, K1a1b1a, K1a4a, K1a9, K2a*, and K2a2a1. He found that K1a9 is shared with Iraqi Jews and with non-Jews in Syria and Iran. K2a2a1 is shared with southern Europeans but might also match the variety of K2a2a in Mizrahi Jews from the Caucasus and is the maternal sister to the Arabian haplogroup K2a2a2. He therefore proposed that K1a9 and K2a2a1 could be of Hebrew origin. Brook similarly found Near Eastern roots for several more Ashkenazi haplogroups, including R0a2m and U1b1. K1a4a is interpreted as a lineage potentially from an ancient Greek or Italian convert to Judaism but also found it in Syria. Several haplogroups are seen as representing the assimilation of West Slavic women in east-central Europe, including V7a and H11b1. The debate over potential Khazar descent was also reexamined. Although Brook did not find any direct connection to Chuvash people nor to any of the medieval Khazar samples that have been collected to date, he pinpointed the Ashkenazic branch of N9a3 as the daughter subclade of a variety found among Bashkirs, a Turkic people of the Ural region, and proposes that the former could come from a Khazar woman. The back cover of Brook's book carries an endorsement by Skorecki.

MtDNA of Sephardi Jews 
Analysis of mitochondrial DNA of the Jewish populations of North Africa (Morocco, Tunisia, Libya) was the subject of further detailed study in 2008 by Doron Behar et al. The analysis concludes that Jews from this region do not share the haplogroups of the mitochondrial DNA haplogroups (M1 and U6) that are typical of the North African Berber and Arab populations.

Behar et al. conclude that it is unlikely that North African Jews have significant Arab, or Berber admixture, "consistent with social restrictions imposed by religious restrictions," or endogamy. This study also found genetic similarities between the Ashkenazi and North African Jews of European mitochondrial DNA pools, but differences between both of these of the diaspora and Jews from the Middle East.

Genetic research shows that about 27% of Moroccan Jews descend from one female ancestor. Behar's study found that 43% of Tunisian Jews are descended from four women along their maternal lines. According to Behar, 39.8% of the mtDNA of Libyan Jews "could be related to one woman carrying the X2e1a1a lineage".

The data (mt-DNA) recovered by D. Behar et al. were from a community descended from crypto-Jews located in the village of Belmonte in Portugal. Because of the small size of the sample and the circumstances of the community having been isolated for so long, It is not possible to generalize the findings to the entire Iberian Peninsula.

There was a relatively high presence of Haplogroup T2e in Sephardim who arrived in Turkey and Bulgaria. This finding suggests that the subhaplogroup, which resembles the populations who live between Saudi Arabia, Egypt and North Central Italy more than the local Iberians, occurred relatively early in the Sephardic population because if it appeared instead at the end of the community's isolation in Iberia, there would be insufficient time for its spread in the population. The frequency of T2e matches in Spain and Portugal are drastically lower than in those listed above Jews. Similarly, fewer Sephardic signature T2e5 matches were found in Iberia than in Northern Mexico and Southwest United States. Mt-DNA of the Jews of Turkey and does not include to a large extent mt-DNA lineages typical of West Asia,. An Iberian-type lineage has been documented, which is consistent with historical data, i.e., the expulsion of Jews from the Iberian Peninsula and their resettlement in Ottoman lands.

MtDNA of Mizrahi Jews 
According to the 2008 study by Behar, 43% of Iraqi Jews are descended from five women. Genetic studies show that Persian and Bukharan Jews descend from a small number of female ancestors. The Mountain Jews showed a striking maternal founding event, with 58.6% of their total mtDNA genetic variation tracing back to one woman from the Levant carrying an mtDNA lineage within Hg J2b.

According to the study of G. Thomas et al., 51% of Georgian Jews are descended from a single female. According to Behar, 58% are descended from this female ancestor. Researchers have not determined the origin of this ancestor, but it is known that this woman carried a haplotype which can be found throughout a large area stretching from the Mediterranean to Iraq and to the Caucasus.

In a study by Richards et al., the authors suggest that a minor proportion of haplogroup L1 and L3A lineage from sub-Saharan Africa is present among Yemenite Jews. However, these lines occur 4 times less frequently than among non-Jewish Yemenis. These sub-Saharan haplogroups are virtually absent among Jews from Iraq, Iran and Georgia and do not appear among Ashkenazi Jews. The Jewish population of Yemen also reveals a founder effect: 42% of the direct maternal lines are traceable to five women, four coming from western Asia and one from East Africa.

MtDNA of Ethiopian Jews 
For Beta Israel, the results are similar to those of the male population, namely, genetic characteristics identical to those of surrounding populations.

MtDNA of Indian Jews 
According to the study of 2008 by Behar et al., the maternal lineage of the Bene Israel and Cochin Jews of India is of predominantly indigenous Indian origin. However, the MtDNA of the Bene Israel also includes lineages commonly found among Iranian and Iraqi Jews and also present among Italian Jews, and the MtDNA of Cochin Jews also has some similarities to MtDNA lineages present in several non-Ashkenazi Jewish communities. Genetic research shows that 41.3% of Bene Israel descend from one female ancestor, who was of indigenous Indian origin. Another study also found that Cochin Jews have genetic similarities with other Jewish populations, in particular with Yemenite Jews, along with the indigenous populations of India.

Autosomal DNA
These studies focus upon autosomal chromosomes, the 22 homologous or autosomes (non sex chromosomes), rather than on the direct paternal or maternal lines. The technology has changed rapidly and so older studies are different in quality to newer ones.

2001–2010 
An initial study conducted in 2001 by Noah Rosenberg and colleagues on six Jewish populations (Poland, Libya, Ethiopia, Iraq, Morocco, Yemen) and two non-Jewish populations (Palestinians and Druze) showed that while the eight groups had genetic links to each other, the Jews of Libya have a distinct genetic signature related to their genetic isolation and possible admixture with Berber populations. This same study suggested a close relationship between the Jews of Yemen and those of Ethiopia.

A 2006 study by Seldin et al. used over five thousand autosomal SNPs to demonstrate European genetic substructure. The results showed "a consistent and reproducible distinction between 'northern' and 'southern' European population groups".  Most northern, central, and eastern Europeans (Finns, Swedes, English, Irish, Germans, and Ukrainians) showed >90% in the 'northern' population group, while most individual participants with southern European ancestry (Italians, Greeks, Portuguese, Spaniards) showed >85% in the 'southern' group. Both Ashkenazi Jews as well as Sephardic Jews showed >85% membership in the "southern" group. Referring to the Jews clustering with southern Europeans, the authors state the results were "consistent with a later Mediterranean origin of these ethnic groups".

A 2007 study by Bauchet et al. found that Ashkenazi Jews were most closely clustered with Arabic North African populations when compared to the global population of that study. In the European structure analysis, they share genetic similarities with Greeks and Sicilians, reflecting their east Mediterranean origins.

A 2008 study by Price et al. sampled Southern Italians, Jews and other Europeans, and isolated the genetic markers that are most accurate for distinguishing between European groups, achieving results comparable to those from genome-wide analyses. It mines much larger datasets (more markers and more samples) to identify a panel of 300 highly ancestry-informative markers which accurately distinguish not just northwest and southeast European, but also Ashkenazi Jewish ancestry from Southern Europeans.

A 2008 study by Tian et al. provides an additional example of the same clustering pattern, using samples and markers similar to those in their other study. European population genetic substructure was examined in a diverse set of >1,000 individuals of European descent, each genotyped with >300 K SNPs. Both STRUCTURE and principal component analyses (PCA) showed the largest division/principal component (PC) differentiated northern from southern European ancestry. A second PC further separated Italian, Spanish, and Greek individuals from those of Ashkenazi Jewish ancestry as well as distinguishing among northern European populations. In separate analyses of northern European participants other substructure relationships were discerned showing a west to east gradient.

A 2009 study by Goldstein et al. shows that it is possible to predict full Ashkenazi Jewish ancestry with 100% sensitivity and 100% specificity, although the exact dividing line between a Jewish and non-Jewish cluster will vary across sample sets which in practice would reduce the accuracy of the prediction. While the full historical demographic explanations for this distinction remain to be resolved, it is clear that the genomes of individuals with full Ashkenazi Jewish ancestry carry an unambiguous signature of their Jewish ancestral DNA, and this seems more likely to be due to their specific Middle Eastern ancestry than to inbreeding. The authors note that there is almost perfect separation along PC 1, and, they note that most of the non-Jewish Europeans who are closest to the Jews on this PC are of Italian or Eastern Mediterranean origin.

In a 2009 study by Kopelman et al., four Jewish groups, Ashkenazi, Turkish, Moroccan and Tunisian, were found to share a common origin from the Middle East, with more recent admixture that has resulted in "intermediate placement of the Jewish populations compared to European and Middle Eastern populations". The authors found that the "The closest genetic neighbors to most Jewish groups were the Palestinians, Israeli Bedouins, and Druze in addition to the Southern Europeans". The Tunisian Jews were found to be distinct from three other Jewish populations, which suggests, according to the authors, a greater genetic isolation or a significant local Berber ancestry, as in the case of Libyan Jews. Concerning the theory of Khazar ancestry in Ashkenazi Jews, the authors found no direct evidence. Although they did find genetic similarities between Jews, especially Ashkenazi Jews, and the Adyghe people, a group from the Caucasus, whose region was formerly occupied by the Khazars, the Adyghe, living on the edge of geographical Europe, are more genetically related to Middle Easterners, including Palestinians, Bedouin, and non-Ashkenazi Jews, than to Europeans.

Another study of L. Hao et al. studied seven groups of Jewish populations with different geographic origin (Ashkenazi, Italian, Greek, Turkish, Iranian, Iraqi, and Syrian) and showed that the individuals all shared a common Middle Eastern background, although they were also genetically distinguishable from each other. In public comments, Harry Ostrer, the director of the Human Genetics Program at NYU Langone Medical Center, and one of the authors of this study, concluded, "We have shown that Jewishness can be identified through genetic analysis, so the notion of a Jewish people is plausible."

A genome-wide genetic study carried out by Need et al. and published in 2009 showed that "individuals with full Jewish ancestry formed a clearly distinct cluster from those individuals with no Jewish ancestry." The study found that the Jewish cluster examined, fell between that of Middle Eastern and European populations. Reflecting on these findings, the authors concluded, "It is clear that the genomes of individuals with full Ashkenazi Jewish ancestry carry an unambiguous signature of their Jewish heritage, and this seems more likely to be due to their specific Middle Eastern ancestry than to inbreeding."

The current study extends the analysis of European population genetic structure to include additional southern European groups and Arab populations. 
While the Ashkenazi are clearly of southern origin based on both PCA and STRUCTURE studies, in this analysis of diverse European populations, this group appears to have a unique genotypic pattern that may not reflect geographic origins.

In June 2010, Behar et al. "shows that most Jewish samples form a remarkably tight subcluster with common genetic origin, that overlies Druze and Cypriot samples but not samples from other Levantine populations or paired Diaspora host populations. In contrast, Ethiopian Jews (Beta Israel) and Indian Jews (Bene Israel and Cochini) cluster with neighboring autochthonous populations in Ethiopia and western India, respectively, despite a clear paternal link between the Bene Israel and the Levant.". "The most parsimonious explanation for these observations is a common genetic origin, which is consistent with an historical formulation of the Jewish people as descending from ancient Hebrew and Israelite residents of the Levant." The authors say that the genetic results are concordant "with the dispersion of the people of ancient Israel throughout the Old World". Regarding the samples he used, Behar says, "Our conclusion favoring common ancestry (of Jewish people) over recent admixture is further supported by the fact that our sample contains individuals that are known not to be admixed in the most recent one or two generations."

A study led by Harry Ostrer published on 11 June 2010, found close links between Ashkenazi, Sephardi, and Mizrahi Jews, and found them to be genetically distinct from non-Jews. In the study, DNA from the blood of 237 Jews and about 2,800 non-Jews was analyzed, and it was determined how closely related they were through IBD. Individuals within the Ashkenazi, Sephardi, and Mizrahi groups shared high levels of IBD, roughly equivalent to that of fourth or fifth cousins. All three groups shared many genetic features, suggesting a common origin dating back more than 2,000 years. The study did find that all three Jewish groups did show various signs of admixture with non Jews, with the genetic profiles of Ashkenazi Jews indicating between 30% and 60% admixture with Europeans, although they clustered more closely with Sephardi and Mizrahi Jews.

In July 2010, Bray et al., using SNP microarray techniques and linkage analysis, found that Ashkenazi Jews clustered between Middle Eastern and European populations but found a closer relationship between the Ashkenazim and several European populations (Tuscans, Italians, and French) than between the Ashkenazi Jews and Middle Eastern populations and that European admixture "is considerably higher than previous estimates by studies that used the Y chromosome." They add their study data "support the model of a Middle Eastern origin of the Ashkenazim population followed by subsequent admixture with host Europeans or populations more similar to Europeans," and that their data imply that modern Ashkenazi Jews are possibly more similar to Europeans than modern Middle Easterners. The level of admixture with European populations was estimated at between 35% and 55%. The study assumed Druze and Palestinian Arab populations to represent the reference to the world Jewry ancestor genome. With this reference point, the linkage disequilibrium in the Ashkenazi Jewish population was interpreted as "matches signs of interbreeding or 'admixture' between Middle Eastern and European populations". Also, in their press release, Bray stated: "We were surprised to find evidence that Ashkenazi Jews have higher heterozygosity than Europeans, contradicting the widely-held presumption that they have been a largely isolated group". The authors said that their calculations might have "overestimated the level of admixture" as it is possible that the true Jewish ancestors were genetically closer to Southern Europeans than to Druze and Palestinian Arabs. They predicted that using the non-Ashkenazi Jewish Diaspora populations as reference for a world Jewry ancestor genome would "underestimate the level of admixture" but that "however, using the Jewish Diaspora populations as the reference Jewish ancestor will naturally underestimate the true level of admixture, as the modern Jewish Diaspora has also undergone admixture since their dispersion.

A 2010 study of autosomal polymorphisms concluded that "East European Jews are closer to Italians in particular and to Europeans in general than to the other Jewish populations", noting that this was also supported by the X chromosomal haplogroups.

An autosomal DNA study carried out in 2010 by Atzmon et al. examined the origin of Iranian, Iraqi, Syrian, Turkish, Greek, Sephardic, and Ashkenazi Jewish communities. The study compared these Jewish groups with 1043 unrelated individuals from 52 worldwide populations. To further examine the relationship between Jewish communities and European populations, 2407 European subjects were assigned and divided into 10 groups based on geographic region of their origin. This study confirmed previous findings of shared Middle Eastern origin of the above Jewish groups and found that "the genetic connections between the Jewish populations became evident from the frequent IBD across these Jewish groups (63% of all shared segments). Jewish populations shared more and longer segments with one another than with non-Jewish populations, highlighting the commonality of Jewish origin. Among pairs of populations ordered by total sharing, 12 out of the top 20 were pairs of Jewish populations, and "none of the top 30 paired a Jewish population with a non-Jewish one". Atzmon concludes that "Each Jewish group demonstrated Middle Eastern ancestry and variable admixture from host population, while the split between Middle Eastern and European/Syrian Jews, calculated by simulation and comparison of length distributions of IBD segments, occurred 100–150 generations ago, which was described as "compatible with a historical divide that is reported to have occurred more than 2500 years ago" as the Jewish community in Iraq and Iran were formed by Jews in the Babylonian and Persian empires during and after Babylonian exile. The main difference between Mizrahi and Ashkenazi/Sephardic Jews was the absence of Southern European components in the former. According to these results, European/Syrian Jewish populations, including the Ashkenazi Jewish community, were formed later, as a result of the expulsion and migration of Jews from Palestine, during Roman rule. Concerning Ashkenazi Jews, this study found that genetic dates "are incompatible with theories that Ashkenazi Jews are for the most part the direct lineal descendants of converted Khazars or Slavs". Citing Behar, Atzmon states that "Evidence for founder females of Middle Eastern origin has been observed in all Jewish populations based on non overlapping mitochondrial haplotypes with coalescence times >2000 years". The closest people related to Jewish groups were the Palestinians, Bedouins, Druze, Greeks, and Italians. Regarding this relationship, the authors conclude that "These observations are supported by the significant overlap of Y chromosomal haplogroups between Israeli and Palestinian Arabs with Ashkenazi and non-Ashkenazi Jewish populations".

2011–2016 
In 2011, Moorjani et al. detected 3%–5% sub-Saharan African ancestry in all eight of the diverse Jewish populations (Ashkenazi Jews, Syrian Jews, Iranian Jews, Iraqi Jews, Greek Jews, Turkish Jews, Italian Jews) that they analyzed. The timing of this African admixture among all Jewish populations was identical. The exact date was not determined, but it was estimated to have taken place between 1,600 and 3,400 years ago. Although African admixture was determined among South Europeans and Near Eastern population too, this admixture was found to be younger compared to the Jewish populations. This findings the authors explained as evidence regarding common origin of these 8 main Jewish groups. "It is intriguing that the Mizrahi Irani and Iraqi Jews—who are thought to descend at least in part from Jews who were exiled to Babylon about 2,600 years ago share the signal of African admixture.  A parsimonious explanation for these observations is that they reflect a history in which many of the Jewish groups descend from a common ancestral population which was itself admixed with Africans, prior to the beginning of the Jewish diaspora that occurred in 8th to 6th century BC" the authors concluded.

In 2012, two major genetic studies were carried out under the leadership of Harry Ostrer, from the Albert Einstein College of Medicine. The results were published in the Proceedings for the National Academy of Sciences. The genes of 509 Jewish donors from 15 different backgrounds and 114 non-Jewish donors of North African origin were analyzed. Ashkenazi, Sephardi, and Mizrahi Jews were found to be closer genetically to each other than to their long-term host populations, and all of them were found to have Middle Eastern ancestry, together with varying amounts of admixture in their local populations. Mizrahi and Ashkenazi Jews were found to have diverged from each other approximately 2,500 years in the past, approximately the time of the Babylonian exile. The studies also reconfirmed the results of previous studies which found that North African Jews were more closely related to each other and to European and Middle Eastern Jews than to their non-Jewish host populations.  The genome-wide ancestry of North African Jewish groups was compared with respect to European (Basque), Maghrebi (Tunisian non-Jewish), and Middle Eastern (Palestinian) origins. The Middle Eastern component was found to be comparable across all North African Jewish and non-Jewish groups, while North African Jewish groups showed increased European and decreased level of North African (Maghrebi) ancestry  with Moroccan and Algerian Jews tending to be genetically closer to Europeans than Djerban Jews. The study found that Yemenite, Ethiopian, and Georgian Jews formed their own distinctive, genetically linked clusters. In particular, Yemenite Jews, who had previously been believed to have lived in isolation, were found to have genetic connections to their host population, suggesting some conversion of local Arabs to Judaism had taken place. Georgian Jews were found to share close connections to Iraqi and Iranian Jews, as well as other Middle Eastern Jewish groups. The study also found that Syrian Jews share more genetic commonality with Ashkenazi Jews than with other Middle Eastern Jewish populations. According to the study:distinctive North African Jewish population clusters with proximity to other Jewish populations and variable degrees of Middle Eastern, European, and North African admixture. Two major subgroups were identified by principal component, neighbor joining tree, and identity-by-descent analysis—Moroccan/Algerian and Djerban/Libyan—that varied in their degree of European admixture. These populations showed a high degree of endogamy and were part of a larger Ashkenazi and Sephardic Jewish group. By principal component analysis, these North African groups were orthogonal to contemporary populations from North and South Morocco, Western Sahara, Tunisia, Libya, and Egypt. Thus, this study is compatible with the history of North African Jews—founding during Classical Antiquity with proselytism of local populations, followed by genetic isolation with the rise of Christianity and then Islam, and admixture following the emigration of Sephardic Jews during the Inquisition.

Ostrer also found that Ethiopian Jews are predominantly related to the indigenous populations of Ethiopia, but do have distant genetic links to the Middle East from more than 2,000 years in the past, and are likely descended from a few Jewish founders. It was speculated that the community began when a few itinerant Jews settled in Ethiopia in ancient times, converted locals to Judaism, and married into the local populations.
 
A 2012 study by Eran Elhaik analyzed data collected for previous studies and concluded that the DNA of Eastern and Central European Jewish populations indicates that their ancestry is "a mosaic of Caucasus, European, and Semitic ancestries". For the study, Bedouins and Jordanian Hashemites, known to descend from Arabian tribes, were assumed to be a valid genetic surrogate of ancient Jews, whereas the Druze, known to come from Syria, were assumed to be non-Semitic immigrants into the Levant. Armenians and Georgians were also used as surrogate populations for the Khazars, who spoke a Turkic language unrelated to Georgian or Armenian. On this basis, a relatively strong connection to the Caucasus was proposed because of the stronger genetic similarity of these Jewish groups to modern Armenians, Georgians, Azerbaijani Jews, Druze and Cypriots, compared to a weaker genetic similarity with Hashemites and Bedouins. This proposed Caucasian component of ancestry was in turn taken to be consistent with the Khazarian Hypothesis as an explanation of part of the ancestry of Ashkenazi Jews.

A study by Haber et al. (2013) noted that while previous studies of the Levant, which had focused mainly on diaspora Jewish populations, showed that the "Jews form a distinctive cluster in the Middle East", these studies did not make clear "whether the factors driving this structure would also involve other groups in the Levant". The authors found strong evidence that modern Levant populations descend from two major apparent ancestral populations. One set of genetic characteristics which is shared with modern-day Europeans and Central Asians is most prominent in the Levant amongst "Lebanese, Armenians, Cypriots, Druze and Jews, as well as Turks, Iranians and Caucasian populations". The second set of inherited genetic characteristics is shared with populations in other parts of the Middle East as well as some African populations. Levant populations in this category today include "Palestinians, Jordanians, Syrians, as well as North Africans, Ethiopians, Saudis, and Bedouins". Concerning this second component of ancestry, the authors remark that while it correlates with "the pattern of the Islamic expansion", and that "a pre-Islamic expansion Levant was more genetically similar to Europeans than to Middle Easterners," they also say that "its presence in Lebanese Christians, Sephardi and Ashkenazi Jews, Cypriots and Armenians might suggest that its spread to the Levant could also represent an earlier event". The authors also found a strong correlation between religion and apparent ancestry in the Levant:

all Jews (Sephardi and Ashkenazi) cluster in one branch; Druze from Mount Lebanon and Druze from Mount Carmel are depicted on a private branch; and Lebanese Christians form a private branch with the Christian populations of Armenia and Cyprus placing the Lebanese Muslims as an outer group. The predominantly Muslim populations of Syrians, Palestinians and Jordanians cluster on branches with other Muslim populations as distant as Morocco and Yemen.

A 2013 study by Doron M. Behar, Mait Metspalu, Yael Baran, Naama M. Kopelman, Bayazit Yunusbayev et al. using integration of genotypes on newly collected largest data set available to date (1,774 samples from 106 Jewish and non-Jewish populations) for assessment of Ashkenazi Jewish genetic origins from the regions of potential Ashkenazi ancestry: (Europe, the Middle East, and the region historically associated with the Khazar Khaganate) concluded that "This most comprehensive study... does not change and in fact reinforces the conclusions of multiple past studies, including ours and those of other groups (Atzmon and others, 2010; Bauchet and others, 2007; Behar and others, 2010; Campbell and others, 2012; Guha and others, 2012; Haber and others; 2013; Henn and others, 2012; Kopelman and others, 2009; Seldin and others, 2006; Tian and others, 2008). We confirm the notion that the Ashkenazi, North African, and Sephardi Jews share substantial genetic ancestry and that they derive it from Middle Eastern and European populations, with no indication of a detectable Khazar contribution to their genetic origins."

The authors also reanalyzed the 2012 study of Eran Elhaik,  and found that "The provocative assumption that Armenians and Georgians could serve as appropriate proxies for Khazar descendants is problematic for a number of reasons as the evidence for ancestry among Caucasus populations do not reflect Khazar ancestry". Also, the authors found that  "Even if it were allowed that Caucasus affinities could represent Khazar ancestry, the use of the Armenians and Georgians as Khazar proxies is particularly poor, as they represent the southern part of the Caucasus region, while the Khazar Khaganate was centered in the North Caucasus and further to the north. Furthermore, among populations of the Caucasus, Armenians and Georgians are geographically the closest to the Middle East, and are therefore expected a priori to show the greatest genetic similarity to Middle Eastern populations." Concerning the similarity of South Caucasus populations to Middle Eastern groups which was observed at the level of the whole genome in one recent study (Yunusbayev and others, 2012). The authors found that  "Any genetic similarity between Ashkenazi Jews and Armenians and Georgians might merely reflect a common shared Middle Eastern ancestry component, actually providing further support to a Middle Eastern origin of Ashkenazi Jews, rather than a hint for a Khazar origin". The authors claimed  "If one accepts the premise that similarity to Armenians and Georgians represents Khazar ancestry for Ashkenazi Jews, then by extension one must also claim that Middle Eastern Jews and many Mediterranean European and Middle Eastern populations are also Khazar descendants. This claim is clearly not valid, as the differences among the various Jewish and non-Jewish populations of Mediterranean Europe and the Middle East predate the period of the Khazars by thousands of years".

A 2014 study by Carmi et al. published by Nature Communications found that the Ashkenazi Jewish population originates from an even mixture between Middle Eastern and European peoples. The study found that all Ashkenazi Jews descend from around 350 individuals who were genetically about half Middle Eastern and half European. This would make all Ashkenazi Jews related to the point of being at least 30th cousins. According to the authors, this genetic bottleneck likely occurred some 600–800 years in the past, followed by rapid growth and genetic isolation (rate per generation 16–53%;). The principal component analysis of common variants in the sequenced AJ samples, confirmed previous observations, namely, the proximity of Ashkenazi Jewish cluster to other Jewish, European and Middle Eastern populations.

A 2016 study by Elhaik et al. in the Oxford University Press published journal Genome Biology and Evolution found that the DNA of Ashkenazi Jews originated in northeastern Turkey. The study found 90% of Ashkenazi Jews could be traced to four ancient villages in northeastern Turkey. The researchers speculated that the Ashkenazi Jews originated in the first millennium, when Iranian Jews converted Greco-Roman, Turkish, Iranian, southern Caucasian, and Slavic populations inhabiting Turkey, and speculated that the Yiddish language also originated there among Jewish merchants as a cryptic language in order to gain advantage in trade along the Silk Road.

In joint study published in 2016 by Genome Biology and Evolution, a group of geneticists and linguists from the UK, Czech Republic, Russia and Lithuania, dismissed both the genetic and linguistic components of Elhaik's 2016 study. As for the genetic component, the authors argued that using a genetic "GPS tool" (as used by Elhaik et al.) would place Italians and Spaniards into Greece, all Tunisians and some Kuwaitis would be placed in the Mediterranean Sea, all Greeks were positioned in Bulgaria and in the Black Sea, and all Lebanese were scattered along a line connecting Egypt and the Caucasus; "These cases are sufficient to illustrate that mapping of test individuals has nothing to do with ancestral locations" the authors wrote. As for the linguistic component, the authors stated "Yiddish is a Germanic language, leaving no room for the Slavic relexification hypothesis and for the idea of early Yiddish-Persian contacts in Asia Minor. The study concluded that 'Yiddish is a Slavic language created by Irano-Turko-Slavic Jewish merchants along the Silk Roads as a cryptic trade language, spoken only by its originators to gain an advantage in trade' (Das et al. (2016) remains an assertion in the realm of unsupported speculation", the study concluded.

A 2016 study of Indian Jews from the Bene Israel community by Waldman et al. found that the genetic composition of the community is "unique among Indian and Pakistani populations we analyzed in sharing considerable genetic ancestry with other Jewish populations. Putting together the results from all analyses point to Bene Israel being an admixed population with both Jewish and Indian ancestry, with the genetic contribution of each of these ancestral populations being substantial." The authors also examined the proportion and roots of the shared Jewish ancestry and the local genetic admixture: "In addition, we performed f4-based analysis to test whether Bene Israel are closer to Jews than to non-Jewish Middle-Eastern populations. We found that Middle-Eastern Jewish populations were closer to Bene Israel as compared to other Middle-Eastern populations examined (Druze, Bedouin and Palestinians). Non-Middle-Eastern Jewish populations were still closer to Bene Israel as compared to Bedouin and Palestinians, but not as compared to Druze. These results further support the hypothesis that the non-Indian ancestry of Bene Israel is Jewish specific, likely from a Middle-Eastern Jewish population."

2017–present 
A 2017 study by Xue et al., running different tests on Ashkenazi Jewish genomes found an approximately even mixture of Middle Eastern and European ancestry and concluded that the true fraction of European ancestry was possibly about 60% with the remaining 40% being Middle Eastern. The authors estimated the Levant as the most likely source of Middle Eastern ancestry in Ashkenazi Jews, and also estimated that between 60% and 80% of the European ancestry was Southern European, "with the rest being likely Eastern European."

A 2020 genetic study on Bronze Age and Iron Age southern Levantine (Canaanite) remains found evidence of large scale migration of populations related to those of the Zagros or Caucasus into the southern Levant by the Bronze Age and increasing over time (resulting in a Canaanite population descended from both those migrants and earlier Neolithic Levantine peoples). The findings were found to be consistent with modern-day non-Jewish Arabic-speaking Levantine populations (such as Syrians, Lebanese, Palestinians, and Druze) and Jewish groups (such as Moroccan Sephardi Jews, Ashkenazi Jews, and Mizrahi Jews), "having 50% or more of their ancestry from people related to groups who lived in the Bronze Age Levant and the Chalcolithic Zagros." Ashkenazi Jews were found to have 41% European admixture. The study modeled the aforementioned modern groups as inheriting ancestry from both ancient populations. Ethiopian Jews were found to derive 80% of their ancestry from an East African or Horn African component, but also carried some Canaanite-like and Zagros-like ancestry.

Comparison to non-Jewish populations

Levantines 

Many genetic studies have demonstrated that most of the various Jewish ethnic divisions and Druze, Palestinians, Bedouin, Lebanese people and other Levantines cluster near one another genetically. They also found substantial genetic overlap between Israeli and Palestinian Arabs and Ashkenazi and Sephardic Jews. A small but statistically significant difference was found in the Y-chromosomal haplogroup distributions of Sephardic Jews and Palestinians, but no significant differences were found between Ashkenazi Jews and Palestinians nor between the two Jewish communities, However, a highly distinct cluster was found in Palestinian haplotypes. 32% of the 143 Arab Y-chromosomes studied belonged to this "I&P Arab clade", which contained only one non-Arab chromosome, that of a Sephardic Jew. This could possibly be attributed to the geographical isolation of the Jews or admixture from other populations.  

The single archeogenetic study of the southern Levant (Salamon et al., 2010) explored mtDNA haplogroups of Chalcolithic period from a cave in the Judean Desert. The prevailing mtDNA haplogroups were those in U3a, H and H6 haplogroup. "U3 is quite frequent in contemporary mtDNA from Near Eastern and Levantine samples suggesting some temporal continuity in mtDNA haplogroups from as far back as the Chalcolithic Era (circa 4500-4000 BCE). In addition, the authors found that the U3a and H6 haplotypes from the ancient DNA samples were present in a broad range of contemporary Jewish populations".

Samaritans 

The Samaritans are a population of northern part of ancient Israel, where they are historically well identified since at least the 4th century BC. They define themselves as the descendants of tribes of Ephraim and Manasseh (named after the two sons of Joseph) living in the Kingdom of Israel before its destruction in 722 BC, as distinct from the Jews, descendants of the Israelites from the southern Kingdom of Judah.

A 2004 study by Shen et al. compared the Y-DNA and DNA-mt of 12 Samaritan men with those of 158 men who were not Samaritans, divided between 6 Jewish populations (Ashkenazi, Moroccan, Libyan, Ethiopian, Iraqi and Yemeni) and 2 non-Jewish populations from Israel (Druze and Arab). The study concludes that significant similarities exist between paternal lines of Jews and Samaritans, but the maternal lines differ between the two populations. The pair-wise genetic distances (Fst) between 11 populations from AMOVA applied to the Y-chromosomal and mitochondrial data. For the Y-chromosome, all Jewish groups (except for the Ethiopian Jews) are closely related to each other and do not differ significantly from the Samaritans (0.041) or Druze (0.033), but are different from Palestinian Arabs (0.163), Africans (0.219), and Europeans (0.111). This study indicated that the Samaritan and Jewish Y-chromosomes have a much greater affinity for the other than for their geographical neighbors, the Palestinian Arabs. This suggests the two share a common ancestral Near Eastern population preceding their divergence in the 4th century BCE, supporting the Samaritan narrative of descent from native Israelites who survived the Assyrian exile rather than from foreign populations introduced by the Assyrian Empire.

A 2013 study by PJ Oefner, et al. found that  "Samaritans are descendants from the tribes of Israel dating to before the Assyrian exile in 722-720 BCE. In concordance with previously published single-nucleotide polymorphism haplotypes, each Samaritan family, with the exception of the Samaritan Cohen lineage, was observed to carry a distinctive Y-chromosome short tandem repeat haplotype that was not more than one mutation removed from the six-marker Cohen modal haplotype" The authors concluded that "Taken together, our results suggest that there has been gene flow between non-Samaritan females and the Samaritan population to a significantly greater extent than for males. The male lineages of the Samaritans, on the other hand, seem to have considerable affinity with those of the five non-Ethiopian Jewish populations examined here. These results are in accordance with expectations based on the endogamous and patrilineal marriage customs of the Samaritans and provide support for an ancient genetic relationship between Samaritans and Israelites."

Lembas

The Lemba clans are scattered among the Bantu-speaking tribes in Zimbabwe and northern South Africa. Their oral tradition traces the origin of the Jewish Lembas to Sana'a in Yemen. Some practices seem reminiscent of Jewish practices (e.g. circumcision, food laws). Two studies have attempted to determine the paternal origin of these tribes. The first by A. Spurdle and T. Jenkins dates from 1996 and suggests that more than half of Lembas tested carry paternal lineages of Semitic origin. The second study by Mark G. Thomas et al. dates from 2000 and also suggests that part of Lembas have a Semitic origin that can come from a mixture of Arabs and Jews. In addition, the authors show that clans Lemba (Buba clan) has a large proportion of the former CMH.

Recent research published in the South African Medical Journal studied Y-Chromosomes variations in two groups of Lemba, one South African and the other Zimbabwean (the Remba). It concluded that "While it was not possible to trace unequivocally the origins of the non-African Y chromosomes in the Lemba and Remba, this study does not support the earlier claims of their Jewish genetic heritage." The researcher suggested "a stronger link with Middle Eastern populations, probably the result of trade activity in the Indian Ocean."

Inhabitants of Spain, Portugal, and Ibero-America

According to a 2008 study by Adams and colleagues the inhabitants of the Iberian Peninsula (Spain and Portugal) have an average of 20% Sephardi Jewish ancestry, with significant geographical variations ranging from 0% on Menorca to 36.3% in southern Portugal. According to the authors, part of this admixture might also be of Neolithic, Phoenician or Arab-Syrian origin.

Modern day Ibero-American populations have also shown varying degrees of Sephardic Jewish ancestry: New Christian converso Iberian settler ancestors of Sephardic Jewish origin. Ibero-Americans are largely the result of admixture between immigrants from Iberia, indigenous peoples of the Americas, and sub-Saharan African slaves, as well as other Europeans and other immigrants. An individual's specific mixture depends on their family genealogy; a significant proportion of immigrants from Iberia (Spain and Portugal) hid their Sephardic Jewish origin.

Researchers analyzed "two well-established communities in Colorado (33 unrelated individuals) and Ecuador (20 unrelated individuals) with a measurable prevalence of the BRCA1 c.185delAG and the GHR c.E180 mutations, respectively [...] thought to have been brought to these communities by Sephardic Jewish progenitors. [...] When examining the presumed European component of these two communities, we demonstrate enrichment for Sephardic Jewish ancestry not only for these mutations, but also for other segments as well. [...] These findings are consistent with historical accounts of Jewish migration from the realms that comprise modern Spain and Portugal during the Age of Discovery. More importantly, they provide a rationale for the occurrence of mutations typically associated with the Jewish Diaspora in Latin American communities."

See also 

 Expulsions and exoduses of Jews
 Genetic history of Europe
 Genetic history of North Africa
 Genetic history of the Middle East
 Genetic studies on Arabs
 Historical Jewish population comparisons
 Interfaith marriage in Judaism
 Jewish diaspora
 Jewish ethnic divisions
 Jewish genealogy
 Jewish studies
 Jews with Haplogroup G
 Khazar hypothesis of Ashkenazi ancestry
 Medical genetics of Jews
 Who is a Jew?

Notes

References

Further reading 

 
 
 
Falk, Raphael. 'Zionut Vehabiologia Shel Hayehudim (Zionism and the Biology of the Jews), Tel Aviv: Resling, 2006
Ostrer, Harry. Legacy: A Genetic History of the Jewish People,'' Oxford University Press, 2012
 

 
Jews
Jews
Jews
Jews
Jewish ethnic groups
Judaic studies
Jews